The 1975 NCAA Division II Soccer Championship was the fourth annual tournament held by the NCAA to determine the top men's Division II college soccer program in the United States.

Baltimore defeated Seattle Pacific in the final match, 3–1, to win their first national title. The final was played in Seattle, Washington on November 29, 1975.

Bracket

Final

See also
 1975 NCAA Division I Soccer Tournament
 1975 NCAA Division III Soccer Championship
 1975 NAIA Soccer Championship

References 

NCAA Division II Men's Soccer Championship
NCAA Division II Men's Soccer Championship
NCAA Division II Men's Soccer Championship
NCAA Division II Men's Soccer Championship